Brahmaeidae is a family of insects in the order Lepidoptera, commonly known as Brahmin moths. It includes species formerly included in the family Lemoniidae.

Diversity
The family consists of 9 genera.

Genera
Acanthobrahmaea
Brachygnatha
Brahmaea
Brahmidia
Calliprogonos
Dactyloceras
Lemonia
Sabalia
Spiramiopsis

References

 
Moth families